St George's Cathedral is an Antiochian Orthodox church in Albany Street, St Pancras, in the London Borough of Camden.  Built to the designs of James Pennethorne, it was consecrated as an Anglican  place of worship called Christ Church in 1837. It became an Orthodox cathedral in 1989.

Description
The building, designed by  James Pennethorne, stands on the corner of Redhill Street (formerly Edward Street)  and Albany Street. It is not strictly orientated, its ceremonial east end,  with the altar, facing slightly west of north. It is rectangular in plan, and built of  brick with stucco and stone dressings, its four corners emphasised by wide tower-like features, projecting slightly beyond the main lines of the walls.  The architecture is broadly classical in style. A deep stucco entablature runs around the whole building, with a simple brick parapet above it. The windows are round-headed. There is a tower above the entrance, topped by an octagonal spire. The steeple is unusually small in comparison with the main body of the church.

History

Anglican church 
It was built as an Anglican church  to serve the largely working class district of Cumberland Market. Consecrated  on  13 July 1837, it established itself firmly within the high church Oxford Movement. Its first incumbent, William Dodsworth, previously of the Margaret Street Chapel, resigned on his conversion to Roman Catholicism.

On the recommendation of the painter William Collins R.A, a copy of Raphael's Transfiguration by Thomas Brigstocke was purchased as an altarpiece. Alterations were made to the church between 1839 and 1843 by the architect R.C. Carpenter,  and further changes, including the installation of an elaborate inlaid marble floor, were made in 1867 by William Butterfield.

Christ Church was frequented by Christina Rossetti who lived in Albany Street for a couple of years. Her brother Dante Gabriel Rossetti produced a stained-glass window depicting the Sermon on the Mount for the church (a second version is elsewhere).

A school grew up on Redhill Street near the church, called Christ Church Primary School. On 26 January 1950 the  funeral service of George Orwell, was held at the church, as it was near to both Middlesex Hospital where he died and BBC Broadcasting House, where he worked.

In 1974, the Albany Consort, an early music group,  was founded at the church.

The church was designated a Grade II* listed building on 10 June 1954.

Orthodox cathedral
In 1989 Christ Church  ceased to be a place of Anglican worship and became St George's Cathedral. With St Botolph-without-Bishopsgate in the City of London it is one of two Antiochan churches in London.  A new roof was built in 2000.

See also
 Saint George: Devotions, traditions and prayers
List of works by R. C. Carpenter

References

Sources 
Mary-Mags

George
Former Church of England church buildings
Church buildings converted to a different denomination
George
Greek Orthodox Church of Antioch
Grade II* listed buildings in the London Borough of Camden
Grade II* listed churches in London
Grade II* listed cathedrals
Cathedrals in London